Neo Yau Hawk-Sau (born 24 September 1990) is a Hong Kong-based actor. He co-founded a political satire group called "Mocking Jer," which specialised in creative derivative work which satirised local news and government. In 2015, he gained recognition with his performance as the main character Pang Shing-Wa in She Remembers, He Forgets. In 2020, he co-founded the YouTube channel "Trial & Error" who produces short drama videos.

He graduated from Yan Oi Tong Tin Ka Ping Secondary School and studied in the School of film and television in the Hong Kong Academy for Performing Arts for his tertiary education.

Career
Yau first came into contact with film as the second assistant director in The Boy Who Shouted Teresa in 2012. He started his acting career in 2013 by acting in Sam Hui Yat (The phonetic translation of the Cantonese title, literally meaning Three Minus One). Yau gained fame after the release of She Remembers, He Forgets in 2015, in which he portrayed the young version of Pang Shing-wa (adult version portrayed by Jan Lamb). In the same year, he was invited to promote Pandora in Christmas with his then-girlfriend .

Yau was very passionate and enthusiastic as an actor and vowed to never give up acting. In his self-introduction in the column of Mocking Jer in Ming Pao, he affirmed that acting was his life-long career. In addition, during an interview with Cecilia So in Stand News, he compared films to his eyes such that he can see this world through movie and this is a world that he wants to dedicate himself to.

In 2019, Yau wrote, produced and directed the drama series Haters Gonna Stay and played its leading role Chau Lok-chau. The series was based on the generational tension through the narratives of Chau and his grandfather. Among the four roles he concurrently served during the production, he said he preferred that of director.

Other works 
Yau had zero interest in politics when he was young, however, the protests against National Education (2012) inspired him to voice out his opinion against unpopular government policies. After the outbreak of the Umbrella Movement, Yau co-founded a political satire group called Mocking Jer in 2014. The group, consisting of young actors and dancers, produced parody videos on YouTube, such as their debut work, a derivative of Young and Dangerous, with an aim to promote awareness other young people about politics of Hong Kong. The group once had more than 30,000 subscribers and caught the attention of 100 Most Magazine founder Lam Yat-hei, a local artist and supporter of the Umbrella Movement. However, Yau was warned that his political views would hurt his future career, but he believed in the message conveyed by and importance of Mocking Jer.

Their first video is a parody of Tenet with reference to the murderer of Poon Hiu-wing.

Filmography

Movies

Television series

Personal life 
On 1 December 2015, he announced that he was in a romantic relationship with actress So Lai-Shan Cecilia, his co-star in She Remembers, He Forgets.  Their relationship ended in 2016.

References

External links 

1990 births
21st-century Hong Kong male actors
Living people
Hong Kong male film actors